Marijn Lybaert is a Belgian professional Magic: The Gathering player. With four Pro Tour top eight finishes and over 200 lifetime Pro Points, he has been one of the most successful Belgians on Tour.

Achievements

References

Living people
Magic: The Gathering players
People from Aalst, Belgium
Year of birth missing (living people)